This is a list of properties and historic districts in Somerville, Massachusetts, that have been listed on the National Register of Historic Places.

The locations of National Register properties and districts (at least for all showing latitude and longitude coordinates below) may be seen in an online map by clicking on "Map of all coordinates".

Current listings

|}

See also

Blue plaque
List of National Historic Landmarks in Massachusetts
National Register of Historic Places listings in Massachusetts
National Register of Historic Places listings in Middlesex County, Massachusetts

References

Somerville, Massachusetts
Somerville

Somerville, Massachusetts